The Västergötland Cavalry Regiment was a Swedish Army cavalry regiment that traced its origins back to the 16th century. It was reorganized into an infantry regiment in 1811. The regiment's soldiers were recruited from the province of Västergötland.

History 
The regiment has its origins in fänikor (companies) raised in Västergötland in the 16th century. In 1613, these units—along with fänikor from the nearby province of Dalsland—were organised by Gustav II Adolf into Västergötlands storregemente. Sometime between 1621 and 1624, the grand regiment was permanently split into four smaller regiments, of which Västergötland Horse Regiment was one.

The regiment was officially raised in 1628 although it had existed since the early 1620s. The regiment soon changed name to Västergötland and Dalsland Horsemen and was one of the original 8 Swedish cavalry regiments mentioned in the 1634 Instrument of Government. The regiment's first commander was Erik Soop. It was renamed to Västergötland Cavalry Regiment in 1655 and was allotted in 1691.

Västergötland Cavalry Regiment was reorganised into a dragoon regiment in 1792 and changed its name to Västergötland Line Dragoon Regiment and later Västergötland Dragoon Regiment to reflect that. The regiment was then reformed into the infantry regiment Västgöta Regiment in 1811.

Campaigns 
?

Organisation 
1634(?)
Livkompaniet
Överstelöjtnantens kompani
Majorens kompani
Södra Vassbo kompani
Älvsborgs kompani
Gudhems kompani
Barne Härads kompani
Vartofta kompani

Name, designation and garrison

See also 
List of Swedish regiments
Provinces of Sweden

References 
Print

Online

Notes 

Cavalry regiments of the Swedish Army